Scarlet Heart, also known as Bubu Jingxin, is a Chinese television series based on the novel of the same Chinese title by Tong Hua. Filming for the series started on 6 December 2010 in Shanghai and ended on 22 March 2011. It first aired in China on the Hunan Broadcasting System (HBS) on 10 September 2011. The following is a list of episodes.

Episodes

See also

 Scarlet Heart
 Bu Bu Jing Xin
 Tong Hua (writer)

References

Scarlet Heart
Lists of Chinese drama television series episodes
Television episodes set in China
Television episodes about dreams